Dr William Rose (1719–1786) was a Scottish schoolmaster and classical scholar.

Life
The eldest son of Hugh Rose of Birse, Aberdeenshire, he was educated at Marischal College, Aberdeen. He later served as usher to the Earl of Dunmore at the Northampton Academy of Philip Doddridge. He then moved to Kew, and in 1758 to Chiswick, where he conducted a successful school until his death, 4 July 1786. Though a dissenter and a Scot, Rose was a friend of Samuel Johnson; but Johnson blamed his leniency on corporal punishment, "for," said he, "what the boys gain at one end they lose at the other." Among Rose's pupils was Charles Burney the younger, who married his daughter Sarah. Among his friends was Bishop Lowth, and his executors were Thomas Cadell and William Strahan, the publishers. He also served as one of Andrew Millar's advisers on incoming manuscripts. Rose, Millar and Strahan were all born and educated in Scotland but pursued their careers in London.

Works
Besides editing Robert Dodsley's The Preceptor (2 vols. 1748), he issued a translation of Sallust's Catiline's Conspiracy and Jugurthine War (London, 1757]). The work was commended in the Bibliographical Miscellany and other reviews, and a fourth edition was edited by Abraham John Valpy in 1830. His classical library was sold by T. Payne on 1 March 1787.

Rose also had a share in editing the Monthly Review.

Family

William Rose married Sarah, daughter of Dr. Samuel Clark; Samuel Rose (1767–1804) was their son. Their daughter Anne married Edward Smith Foss, and was mother of Edward Foss.

Notes

Attribution

Further reading
Gherity, "A Quest for an Unrecognised Publication of Adam Smith" (1971) 18(1) Scottish Journal of Political Economy 113, reprinted in Wood (ed), Adam Smith: Critical Assessments, Croom Helm, 1984, Routledge, 1993, 1996, vol 4, at p 138 et seq.
Daniel Lysons. The Environs of London. Second Edition. Printed for T Cadell and W Davies. Strand, London. 1811. Volume 2. Part 1. Pages 130 and 138.

1719 births
1786 deaths
Alumni of the University of Aberdeen